Chukat, HuQath , Hukath, or Chukkas ( — Hebrew for "decree," the ninth word, and the first distinctive word, in the parashah) is the 39th weekly Torah portion (parashah) in the annual Jewish cycle of Torah reading and the sixth in the Book of Numbers. The parashah sets out the laws of corpse contamination (tumat hamet) and purification with the water of lustration prepared with the Red Cow (parah adumah, also called the “Red Heifer”).  It also reports the deaths of Miriam and Aaron, the failure of Moses at the Waters of Meribah, and the conquest of Arad, the Amorites, and Bashan. The parashah comprises . The parashah is the shortest weekly Torah portion in the Book of Numbers (although not the shortest in the Torah), and is made up of 4,670 Hebrew letters, 1,245 Hebrew words, 87 verses, and 159 lines in a Torah Scroll (Sefer Torah).

Jews generally read it in late June or July. In most years (for example, in 2019, 2021, 2022, 2024, 2025, and 2028), parashah Chukat is read separately. In some years (for example, 2020, 2023, 2026, and 2027) when the second day of Shavuot falls on a Sabbath in the Diaspora (where observant Jews observe Shavuot for two days), parashah Chukat is combined with the subsequent parashah, Balak, in the Diaspora to synchronize readings thereafter with those in Israel (where Jews observe Shavuot for one day).

Jews also read the first part of the parashah,  in addition to the regular weekly Torah portion, on the Sabbath after Purim, called Shabbat Parah. On Shabbat Parah, a reader chants the regular weekly Torah portion first, and then a reader chants the chapter of the Red Cow. Shabbat Parah occurs shortly before Passover, and  sets out the procedure by which the Israelites could purify themselves from the impurity of death (tumat hamet), and so prepare for the Pilgrimage Festival of Passover.

Readings 

First reading — Numbers 19:1–17 
In the first reading (aliyah), God told Moses and Aaron to instruct the Israelites regarding the ritual law of the Red Cow (parah adumah) used to create the water of lustration. The cow was to be without blemish, have no defect, and not have borne a yoke. Eleazar the priest was to take it outside the camp, observe its slaughter, and take some of its blood with his finger and sprinkle it seven times toward the Tabernacle. The cow was to be burned in its entirety along with cedar wood, hyssop, and crimson wool. The priest and the one who burned the cow were both to wash their garments, bathe in water, and be unclean until evening. The ashes of the cow were to be used to create the water of lustration. One who touched the corpse of any human being was to be unclean for seven days. On the third and seventh days, the person who had touched the corpse was to cleanse with the water of lustration and then be clean. One who failed to do so would remain unclean, would defile the Tabernacle, and would be cut off from Israel. When a person died in a tent, whoever entered the tent was to be unclean seven days, and every open vessel in the tent was to be unclean. In the open, anyone who touched a corpse, bone, or a grave was to be unclean seven days.

Second reading — Numbers 19:18–20:6 
In the second reading (aliyah), a person who was clean was to add fresh water to ashes of the Red Cow, dip hyssop it in the water, and sprinkle the water on the tent, the vessels, and people who had become unclean. The person who sprinkled the water was then to wash his clothes, bathe in water, and be clean at nightfall. Anyone who became unclean and failed to cleanse himself was to be cut off from the congregation. The person who sprinkled the water of lustration was to wash his clothes, and whoever touched the water of lustration, whatever he touched, and whoever touched him were to be unclean until evening. The Israelites arrived at Kadesh in the wilderness of Zin, and Miriam died and was buried there. The people were without water, and they complained against Moses and Aaron. Moses and Aaron fell on their faces at the entrance of the Tent of Meeting, and the Presence of God appeared to them.

Third reading — Numbers 20:7–13 
In the third reading (aliyah), God told Moses that he and Aaron should take the rod and order the rock to yield its water. Moses took the rod, assembled the congregation in front of the rock, and said to them: "Listen, you rebels, shall we get water for you out of this rock?" Then Moses struck the rock twice with his rod, out came water, and the community and their animals drank. But God told Moses and Aaron: "Because you did not trust Me enough to affirm My sanctity in the sight of the Israelite people, therefore you shall not lead this congregation into the land that I have given them." The water was named Meribah, meaning quarrel or contention."

Fourth reading — Numbers 20:14–21 
In the fourth reading (aliyah), Moses sent messengers to the king of Edom asking him to allow the Israelites to cross Edom, without passing through fields or vineyards, and without drinking water from wells. But the Edomites would not let the Israelites pass through, and turned out in heavy force to block their way, and the Israelites turned away.

Fifth reading — Numbers 20:22–21:9 
In the fifth reading (aliyah), at Mount Hor, God told Moses and Aaron: "Let Aaron be gathered to his kin: he is not to enter the land that I have assigned to the Israelite people, because you disobeyed my command about the waters of Meribah." Moses took Aaron and his son Eleazar up on Mount Hor, and there he stripped Aaron of his vestments and put them on Eleazar, and Aaron died there. The Israelites mourned Aaron 30 days. The king of Arad engaged the Israelites in battle and took some of them captive. The Israelites vowed that if God gave them victory, they would destroy Arad. God delivered up the Canaanites, and the Israelites killed them and destroyed their cities, calling the place Hormah. The people grew restive and spoke against God and Moses, so God let loose serpents that killed many of the Israelites. The people came to Moses, admitted their sin by speaking against God, and asked Moses to intercede with God to take away the serpents, and Moses did so. God told Moses to mount a Nehushtan, or bronze serpent figure, on a pole, saying: "If anyone who is bitten looks at it, he shall recover."

Sixth reading — Numbers 21:10–20 
In the sixth reading (aliyah), the Israelites traveled on to Oboth, Ije-abarim, the valley of Zered, the other side of the Arnon, Beer, Mattanah, Nahaliel, Bamoth, and the field of Moab, by the top of Mount Pisgah.

Seventh reading — Numbers 21:21–22:1 
In the seventh reading (aliyah), the Israelites sent messengers to Sihon, king of the Amorites, asking that he allow them to pass through his country, without entering the fields or vineyards, and without drinking water from wells. But Sihon would not let Israel pass through his territory and engaged the Israelites in battle. The Israelites defeated the Amorites and took possession of their land and towns.

Then the Israelites marched on, and King Og of Bashan engaged them in battle. The Israelites defeated his forces and took possession of his country. The Israelites then marched to the steppes of Moab, across the Jordan River from Jericho.

Readings according to the triennial cycle 
Jews who read the Torah according to the triennial cycle of Torah reading read the parashah according to a different schedule.

In inner-biblical interpretation 
The parashah has parallels or is discussed in these Biblical sources:

Numbers chapter 19

Corpse contamination 

In  God instructed Moses to direct the priests not to allow themselves to become defiled by contact with the dead, except for a mother, father, son, daughter, brother, or unmarried sister. And the priests were not to engage in mourning rituals of making baldness upon their heads, shaving off the corners of their beards, or cutting their flesh.

In  God instructed Moses to command the Israelites to put out of the camp every person defiled by contact with the dead, so that they would not defile their camps, in the midst of which God dwelt.

 sets out a procedure for a Red Cow mixture for decontamination from corpse contamination.

In its profession associated with tithing,  instructed Israelites to aver that they had not eaten from the tithe in mourning, nor put away any of it while unclean, nor given any of it to the dead.

In  the prophet Ezekiel cites the burial of kings within the Temple as one of the practices that defiled the Temple and cause God to abandon it.

And perhaps similarly,  associates it with childbirth, and  associates it with skin disease.  associates it with various sexuality-related events.

Numbers chapter 20 
Psalms  and  recall Meribah: "I tested you at the waters of Meribah" and "Harden not your heart, as at Meribah, as in the day of Massah in the wilderness."

Numbers chapter 21 
The defeat of the Canaanites recorded at Hormah in  followed an earlier unsuccessful attempt to enter into the Promised Land reported in  when the Amalekites and the Canaanites excluded the Israelites and pushed them back as far as Hormah. On two occasions, the Israelites proposed passage through territories without recourse to local resources ( and ), and on one they proposed payment terms for use of local supplies. When the Edomite King refused to allow passage, the Israelites took an alternate route, whereas when the Amorite King refused them passage, they chose to press on anyway with the aid of 'the edge of the sword'.

 reports that Israel put the Amorites to the sword and took possession of their land. Similarly, in  the 8th century BCE prophet Amos announced that God said: “I destroyed the Amorite before them, whose stature was like the cedar’s and who was stout as the oak, destroying his boughs above and his trunk below!”

In early nonrabbinic interpretation
The parashah has parallels or is discussed in these early nonrabbinic sources:

Numbers chapter 19–20
Josephus told that after having completed her fortieth year in the wilderness, Miriam died (as reported in ). The Israelites staged an expensive public funeral for her, and buried her on a mountain called Sin. After they had mourned for her 30 days, Moses purified the people by preparing the first mixture of the water of lustration prepared with the Red Cow described in

Numbers chapter 21
Professor Lawrence Schiffman of New York University noted that one of the Dead Sea Scrolls, the Damascus Document, contains a portion that has become known as the “Well Midrash,” which interprets  to say, “A well which the officers have dug, which the notables of the people have dug . . . .” The Damascus Document then interpreted the “well” to refer to the Torah, and interpreted those who dug it to be the returnees or penitents of Israel who left the Land of Judea to live in what they called the “Land of Damascus.” Schiffman explained that the Damascus Document seems to refer to an exodus of the sectarians from Judea to the wilderness of Qumran, which they called “Damascus.”

In classical rabbinic interpretation 
The parashah is discussed in these rabbinic sources from the era of the Mishnah and the Talmud:

Numbers chapter 19 

Rabbi Rabbi Johanan said in the name of Rabbi Bana'ah that the Torah was transmitted in separate scrolls, as  says, "Then said I, 'Lo I am come, in the roll of the book it is written of me.'" Rabbi Simeon ben Lakish (Resh Lakish), however, said that the Torah was transmitted in its entirety, as  "Take this book of the law." The Gemara reported that Rabbi Johanan interpreted  "Take this book of the law," to refer to the time after the Torah had been joined from its several parts. And the Gemara suggested that Resh Lakish interpreted  "in a roll of the book written of me," to indicate that the whole Torah is called a "roll," as  says, "And he said to me, 'What do you see?' And I answered, 'I see a flying roll.'" Or perhaps, the Gemara suggested, it is called "roll" for the reason given by Rabbi Levi, who said that God gave eight sections of the Torah, which Moses then wrote on separate rolls, on the day on which the Tabernacle was set up.

Tractate Parah in the Mishnah and Tosefta interpreted the laws of the Red Cow in 

Rabbi Tanhum taught that they were given on account of the tribe of Levi, of whom it is written (in ), "he [God's messenger] shall purify the sons of Levi and purge them."

In connection with the Red Cow, the Mishnah noted the paradox that the garments of all those who took any part in the preparation of the Red Cow became defiled, but the cow itself made garments ritually clean. And  applies the term "statute" to the Red Cow.

A Midrash taught that an idolater once asked Rabban Johanan ben Zakkai about the Red Cow, likening its procedures to witchcraft. Rabban Johanan asked the idolater what he had seen done for a man possessed by a demon of madness. The idolater explained how in such a case, they would bring roots, make them smoke under the madman, sprinkle water on the man, and the demon would flee. Rabban Johanan told him that the Red Cow dealt similarly with the spirit of uncleanness, as  says: "And also I will cause the prophets and the unclean spirit to pass out of the land." Rabban Johanan told him that when they sprinkled the water of purification on the unclean, the spirit of uncleanness fled. But when the idolater had gone, Rabban Johanan's disciples told Rabban Johanan that they saw that he had put off the idolater with a mere makeshift, and asked him what explanation Rabban Johanan would give them. Rabban Johanan told his disciples that the dead did not defile nor the water purify; God had merely laid down a statute, issued a decree, and commanded that we not transgress the decree, as  says: "This is the statute of the law."

Expounding upon the commandment of the Red Cow in  Rabbi Jose ben Hanina taught that God told Moses the reason for the commandment, but to everyone else it would remain merely a statute.

Noting that  “This is the statute (chukat) of the Law,” uses the same term as  “This is the ordinance (chukat) of the Passover,” a Midrash found the statute of the Passover and the statute of the Red Heifer similar to one another. The Midrash taught that  “Let my heart be undivided in your statutes,” refers to this similarity, and asked which statute is greater than the other. The Midrash likened this to the case of two ladies who were walking side by side together apparently on an equal footing; who then is the greater? She whom her friend accompanies to her house and so is really being followed by the friend. The Midrash concluded that the law of the Red Cow is the greater, for those who eat the Passover need the Red Cow's purifying ashes, as  says, “And for the unclean they shall take of the ashes of the burning of the purification from sin.”

All other communal sacrifices were of male animals, but the Red Cow was of a female animal. Rabbi Aibu explained the difference with a parable: When a handmaiden's boy polluted a king's palace, the king called on the boy's mother to clear away the filth. In the same way, God called on the Red Cow to come and atone for the incident of the Golden Calf.

A Midrash taught that when God so pleased, God called for atonement for the Golden Calf through a female agent, as in  “That they bring you a red heifer (parah), faultless, wherein is no blemish . . .

Rabbi Eliezer ruled that the calf (eglah) prescribed in  had to be no more than one year old and the Red Cow (parah) prescribed in  had to be two years old. But the Sages ruled that the calf could be even two years old and the Red Cow could be three or four years old. Rabbi Meir ruled that the Red Cow could be even five years old, but they did not wait with an older cow, as it might in the meantime grow some black hairs and thus become invalid.

Rabbi Eliezer ruled that a Red Cow that was pregnant was nonetheless valid, but the Sages ruled it invalid. Rabbi Eliezer ruled that the Red Cow could not be purchased from Gentiles, but the Sages ruled that such cow could be valid.
If the horns or the hoofs of the Red Cow were black, they were chopped off, and the Red Cow was then valid. The cow's eye, teeth, and tongue could cause no invalidity. And a dwarf-like cow was nonetheless valid. If the Red Cow had a sebaceous cyst and they cut it off, Rabbi Judah ruled the cow invalid, but Rabbi Simeon ruled it invalid only if no red hair grew in its place.

A Red Cow born by a caesarean section, the hire of a harlot, or the price of a dog was invalid. Rabbi Eliezer ruled it valid, for  states, "You shall not bring the hire of a harlot or the price of a dog into the house of the Lord your God," and the Red Cow was not brought into the Temple. The Mishnah taught that all blemishes that caused consecrated animals to be invalid as sacrifices also caused the Red Cow to be invalid. If one had ridden on the cow, leaned on it, hung on its tail, crossed a river with its help, doubled up its leading rope, or put one's cloak on it, the cow was invalid. But if one had only fastened it by its leading rope or made for it a sandal to prevent it from slipping, or spread one's cloak on it because of flies, it remained valid. The general rule was that wherever one did something for its own sake, the cow remained valid; but if one did something for the sake of another purpose, it invalidated the cow. If a bird rested on the cow, it remained valid. If a bull mounted it, it became invalid; but Rabbi Judah ruled that if people brought the bull to mate with the cow, the cow became invalid, but if the bull did so on its own, the cow remained valid.

If a cow had two black or white hairs growing within one follicle, it was invalid. Rabbi Judah said even within one hollow. If the hairs grew within two adjacent follicles, the cow was invalid. Rabbi Akiva ruled that even if there were four or even five non-red hairs, if they were dispersed, they could be plucked out. Rabbi Eliezer ruled that even as many as 50 such hairs could be plucked. But Rabbi Joshua ben Bathyra ruled that even if it had only one non-red hair on its head and one on its tail, it was invalid. If the cow had two hairs in one follicle with their roots black and their tips red or with their roots red and their tips black, Rabbi Meir taught that what was visible determined validity; but the Sages ruled that validity followed the root.

Rav Judah reported in Samuel's name an account of the rarity of completely Red Cows: When they asked Rabbi Eliezer how far the honor due parents extended, Rabbi Eliezer told of a non-Jew from Ashkelon named Dama son of Nethinah. The Sages offered Dama a profit of 600,000 gold denarii (or Rav Kahana said 800,000 denarii) in exchange for jewels that he had that the Sages could use in the ephod, but as the key to the jewels lay under Dama's father's pillow, Dama declined the offer so as not to trouble his father. The next year, God rewarded Dama by causing a Red Cow to be born in his herd. When the Sages went to buy it, Dama told them that he knew that he could ask for all the money in the world and they would pay it, but he asked for only the money that he had lost in honoring his father.

Rabbi Eliezer concluded that both actions had to be conducted outside the three camps of the Israelites, and in the time of the Temple in Jerusalem, both actions had to be conducted to the east of Jerusalem.

The Gemara reported that Rav and Samuel disagreed about the answer. Rav held it invalid for a lay Israelite to slaughter the Red Cow and valid for a lay Israelite to slaughter the High Priest's bull, while Samuel held it invalid for a lay Israelite to slaughter the High Priest's bull and valid for a lay Israelite to slaughter the Red Cow. The Gemara reported that Rav Zeira (or some say Rav Zeira in the name of Rav) said that the slaughtering of the Red Cow by a lay Israelite was invalid, and Rav deduced from this statement the importance that  specifies "Eleazar" and  specifies that the law of the Red Cow is a "statute" (and thus required precise execution). But the Gemara asked whether the same logic might apply to the Red Cow, as well, as it was not a Temple service, either. The Gemara posited that one might consider the Red Cow to have been in the nature of an offering for Temple upkeep. The Gemara then turned to Samuel's position, that a lay Israelite could kill the Red Cow. And Rav explained the words "in his sight" in one place to refer to the slaughtering, and in the other to the burning, and the law enjoined his attention to both. In contrast, the Gemara posited that Eleazar might not have needed to pay close attention to the casting in of cedar wood, hyssop, and scarlet, because they were not part of the Red Cow itself.

As the Mishnah taught, if the Red Cow refused to go forth, one could not send a black cow with the Red Cow, lest people say that they slaughtered a black cow, nor could two Red Cows be brought forth together, lest people say that they slaughtered two. Rabbi (or others say Rabbi Jose) taught that a second cow was not to be taken out because  says "and he shall bring it forth" and "it" implies by itself. The Gemara taught that the teaching of the Mishnah and Rabbi differed in the case of whether one could bring forth a donkey with the Red Cow. (According to the Mishnah, that would be permitted, because the presence of the donkey would not mislead people that they were sacrificing the donkey, but according to Rabbi, it would be forbidden, for "it" excludes permission for any other animal to be brought forth together with the Red Cow.)

The Midrash noted that many things appear lowly, but God commanded many precepts to be performed with them.

Rabbi Isaac had heard that one required a definite size, while the other did not, but he did not know which was which. Rav Joseph reasoned that because (as Mishnah Yoma 6:6 explains) the red thread of the scapegoat was divided, that thread required a definite size, whereas that of the Red Cow, which did not need to be divided, did not require a definite size. Rami bar Hama objected that the thread of the Red Cow required a certain weight (to be cast into the flames, as described in ). Rava said that the matter of this weight was disputed by Tannaim (as explained below). Abaye objected (based on Mishnah Parah 3:11) that they wrapped the red thread together with the cedar wood and hyssop. Rav Hanin said in the name of Rav that if the cedar wood and the red thread were merely caught by the flame, they were used validly. They objected to Rav Hanin based on a Baraita which taught that if the thread caught fire in midair, they brought another thread to prepare the water of lustration. Abaye reconciled the two opinions by interpreting the Baraita to speak of a flame that blazed high above the cow, and interpreting Rav Hanin to speak of a subdued flame that consumed the thread near the burning cow. Rava explained the dispute among Tannaim about the weight of the red thread in connection with the Red Cow. Rabbi taught that they wrapped the cedar wood and hyssop together with the red thread so that they formed one bunch. Rabbi Eleazar the son of Rabbi Simeon said that they wrapped them together so that they had sufficient weight to fall into the midst of the burning cow.

When Rabin came, he said in the name of Rabbi Jonathan that the thread in connection with the Red Cow weighed ten zuz, that of the scapegoat weighed two selas, and that of the person with skin disease weighed a shekel. Rabbi Johanan said that Rabbi Simeon ben Halafta and the Sages disagreed about the thread of the Red Cow, one saying that it weighed ten shekels, the other that it weighed one shekel. Rabbi Jeremiah of Difti said to Ravina that they disagreed not about the thread of the Red Cow, but about that of the scapegoat.

The Mishnah taught that seven days before the burning of the Red Cow, they removed the priest who was to burn the cow from his house to a room called the stone chamber facing the north-eastern corner of the Temple. The Mishnah taught that throughout the seven days, they sprinkled on the priest a mixture of all the sin-offerings that were there, but Rabbi Jose taught that they sprinkled only on the third and the seventh days. And Rabbi Hanina the Deputy High Priest taught that on the priest who was to burn the cow they sprinkled all the seven days, but on the one who was to perform the service on Yom Kippur they sprinkled only on the third and the seventh days.

To protect against defilement from contact with the dead, they built courtyards over bedrock, and left beneath them a hollow to serve as protection against a grave in the depths. They used to bring pregnant women there to give birth and rear their children in this ritually pure place. They placed doors on the backs of oxen and placed the children upon them with stone cups in their hands. When the children reached the pool of Siloam, the children stepped down, filled the cups with water, and then climbed back up on the doors. Rabbi Jose said that each child used to let down his cup and fill it from on top of the oxen. When the children arrived at the Temple Mount with the water, they got down. Beneath the Temple Mount and the Temple courtyards was a hollow, which protected against contamination from a grave in the depths. At the entrance of the court of the women, they kept a jar of the ashes of the sin-offerings. If they did not find the residue of the ashes of seven Red Cows, they performed the sprinkling with those of six, of five, of four, of three, of two or of one. They made a causeway from the Temple Mount to the Mount of Olives, arches above arches, each arch placed directly above each pier of the arch below, as a protection against a grave in the depths, on which the priest who was to burn the cow, the cow itself, and all who aided in its preparation went forth to the Mount of Olives. If the cow refused to go out, they did not take out with it a black cow, lest it be said that they killed a black cow instead of a Red Cow. Nor did they bring out another Red Cow, lest it be said that they killed two Red Cows. But Rabbi Jose said it was not for this reason, but because  says, "And he shall bring her forth," implying: by herself.

The elders of Israel used to precede them on foot to the Mount of Olives, where there was a place of immersion. The priest who was to burn the cow was deliberately made unclean in contravention of the teaching of the Sadducees, who taught that the cow needed to be slaughtered by one on whom the sun had set after cleansing from his impurity. They laid their hands upon the priest and said, "My lord High Priest, immerse once." He then immersed himself, came up, and dried himself. They laid out different kinds of wood there — cedar wood, pine, spruce, and the wood of smooth fig trees. They built up the pile of wood in the shape of a tower furnished with air holes, and they turned its foreside towards the west.

The Mishnah taught that they bound the Red Cow with a bast rope and placed it on the pile with its head towards the south and its face towards the west. The priest stood on the east side facing west. He slaughtered the cow with his right hand and received the blood with his left hand. But Rabbi Judah said that he received the blood with his right hand, put it on his left hand, and then sprinkled with his right hand. He dipped his finger in the blood and sprinkled it towards the Holy of Holies seven times, dipping once for each sprinkling.

The Mishnah taught that during the time of the Temple in Jerusalem, all the walls of the Temple were high except the eastern wall. This was so that the priest who burned the Red Cow, while standing on the top of the Mount of Olives, might see the door of the main Temple building when he sprinkled the blood.

The Mishnah also taught that in the time of the Temple, there were five gates to the Temple Mount. The Eastern Gate was decorated with a picture of Shushan, the capital of Persia, and through that gate the High Priest would burn the Red Cow and all those attending to it would exit to the Mount of Olives.

The Mishnah taught that when the priest had finished the sprinkling, he wiped his hand on the body of the cow, climbed down, and kindled the fire with wood chips. But Rabbi Akiva said that he kindled the fire with dry branches of palm trees. When the cow's carcass burst in the fire, the priest took up a position outside the pit, took hold of the cedar wood, hyssop, and scarlet wool, and said to the observers: "Is this cedar wood? Is this hyssop? Is this scarlet wool?" He repeated each question three times, and the observers answered "Yes" three times to each question. The priest then wrapped the cedar wood, hyssop, and scarlet wool together with the ends of the wool and cast them into the burning pyre. When the fire burned out, they beat the ashes with rods and then sifted them with sieves. They then divided the ashes into three parts: One part was deposited on the rampart, one on the Mount of Olives, and one was divided among the courses of priests who performed the Temple services in turn.

The Mishnah taught that the funding for the Red Cow came out of the appropriation of the chamber. The ramp for the Red Cow came out of the remainder in the chamber. Abba Saul said that the high priests paid for the ramp out of their own funds.

Rabbi Meir taught that Moses prepared the first Red Cow ashes, Ezra prepared the second, and five were prepared since then. But the Sages taught that seven were prepared since Ezra. They said that Simeon the Just and Johanan the High Priest prepared two each, and Eliehoenai the son of Hakof, Hanamel the Egyptian, and Ishmael the son of Piabi each prepared one.

Reading  “And it [the mixture of ash and water] shall be kept for the congregation of the children of Israel,” the Pesikta de-Rav Kahana taught that in this world priests used the water of the Red Cow to make things ritually clean or unclean, but in the World To Come, God will purify Israel, as   says, “I will sprinkle clean water upon you, and you shall be clean; from all your uncleannesses, and from all your idols, I cleanse you.”

But the Red Cow (as well as the bull and the scapegoat) did not itself render unclean clothes with which it came in contact. The Mishnah imagined the clothing saying to the person: "Those that render you unclean do not render me unclean, but you render me unclean."

Tractate Oholot in the Mishnah and Tosefta interpreted the laws of corpse contamination in  Rabbi Eleazar ben Azariah counseled Rabbi Akiva to stop studying Aggadah (the homiletic exegetical texts of classical rabbinic literature) and turn instead to the complicated laws concerning impurity through skin disease (in Tractate Negaim) and corpse contamination (in Tractate Oholot).

The Mishnah taught that there are cases where two things can be rendered impure in succession by a corpse, one of those things being rendered impure with a seven-day impurity and the other thing being rendered impure with an impurity lasting until the evening. There are cases where three things can be rendered impure in succession by a corpse, two of those things being rendered impure with a seven-day impurity and the remaining thing with an impurity lasting until the evening. And there are cases where four things can be rendered impure in succession by a corpse, three of those things being rendered impure with a seven-day impurity and the remaining thing with an impurity lasting until the evening.

The Mishnah taught that a case of corpse contamination of two things in succession (where one is rendered impure with a seven-day impurity and one being rendered impure with an impurity until the evening) occurs when a person who touches a corpse is rendered impure with a seven-day impurity, as  says, "He who touches the corpse of any human being shall be unclean for seven days." The Rabbis considered a corpse to have the highest power to defile, and regarded a corpse as an originating source of impurity, a "father of fathers of impurity" (avi avot ha-tumah). Thus the Mishnah taught that a corpse can confer a generating impurity, a "father of impurity" (av ha-tumah), on a person with whom it comes in contact. A "father of impurity" (av ha-tumah) requires a seven-day cleansing period. And then a second person who touches the first person who touched the corpse is rendered impure with an impurity lasting until the evening, as  says, "the person who touches him shall be unclean until evening." The "father of impurity" (av ha-tumah) — in this case, the person who first touched the corpse — can, in turn, confer a first-grade impurity (rishon l'tumah), which requires a cleansing period lasting only until sundown. In sum, in this case, the first person acquired a "father of impurity" (av ha-tumah) from the corpse, and the second person acquired a first-grade impurity (rishon l'tumah) from the first person.

Resh Lakish derived from  “This is the Torah, when a man shall die in the tent,” that words of Torah are firmly held by one who kills himself for Torah study.

The Mishnah taught that a case of corpse contamination of three things in succession (where two are rendered impure with seven-day impurity and one with an impurity until the evening) occurs when a utensil touching a corpse becomes a "father of fathers of impurity" (avi avot ha-tumah) like the corpse, as  says, "whoever in the open field touches one that is slain with a sword, or one that died . . . shall be impure seven days," and from the words "slain with a sword," the Rabbis deduced that "a sword is like the one slain" (cherev harei hu kechalal), and thus a utensil that touches a corpse is a "father of fathers of impurity" (avi avot ha-tumah) like the corpse. And another utensil touching this first utensil is rendered impure — a "father of impurity" (av ha-tumah) — and both utensils acquire a seven-day impurity. But the third thing in this series, whether a person or a utensil, is then rendered impure with an impurity lasting until the evening — a first-grade impurity (rishon l'tumah).

And the Mishnah taught that a case of corpse contamination of four things in succession (where three are rendered impure with seven-day impurity and one with impurity until the evening) occurs when a utensil touching a corpse is rendered a "father of fathers of impurity" (avi avot ha-tumah) like the corpse, a person touching these utensils is rendered a "father of impurity" (av ha-tumah), and another utensil touching this person is rendered impure with a seven-day impurity — a "father of impurity" (av ha-tumah) — as the Rabbis read  "And you shall wash your clothes on the seventh day, and you shall be clean," to teach that persons who have touched a corpse convey seven-day impurity to utensils. The fourth thing in this series, whether a person or a utensil, is then rendered impure with an impurity lasting until the evening — a first-grade impurity (rishon l'tumah).

The Mishnah taught that there are 248 parts in a human body, and each one of these parts can render impure by contact, carrying, or being under the same roof when they have upon them flesh sufficient that they could heal if still connected to a living person. But if they do not have sufficient flesh upon them, these individual parts can render impure only by contact and carrying but cannot render impure by being under the same roof (although a mostly intact corpse does).

Ulla taught that the Rabbis ruled the skin of dead people contaminating so as to prevent people from fashioning their parents' skin into keepsakes.</ref> Similarly, the Mishnah taught that the Sadducees mocked the Pharisees, because the Pharisees taught that the Holy Scrolls rendered unclean the hands that touched them, but the books of Homer did not. In response, Rabban Johanan ben Zakkai noted that both the Pharisees and the Sadducees taught that a donkey's bones were clean, yet the bones of Johanan the High Priest were unclean. The Sadducees replied to Rabban Johanan that the uncleanness of human bones flowed from the love for them, so that people should not make keepsakes out of their parents' bones. Rabban Johanan replied that the same was true of the Holy Scriptures, for their uncleanness flowed from the love for them. Homer's books, which were not as precious, thus did not render unclean the hands that touched them.

But the Sages held that these effects of sprinkling applied only in the case of things that were susceptible to uncleanness. The Gemara explained that the Rabbis' view could be deduced from the logical proposition that the greater includes the lesser: If sprinkling upon the unclean makes clean, how much more so should sprinkling upon the clean keep clean or make cleaner? And the Gemara said that it is with reference to Rabbi Akiva's position that Solomon said in Ecclesiastes  "I said, ‘I will get wisdom,' but it is far from me." That is, even Solomon could not explain it.

And from the storehouse of Yavneh Rabbi Joshua ben Kebusai learned that one clean person could sprinkle even a hundred unclean persons.

Numbers chapter 20 

Rabbi Eleazar taught that Miriam died with a Divine kiss, just as Moses would. As  says, "So Moses the servant of the Lord died there in the land of Moab by the mouth of the Lord," and  says, "And Miriam died there" — both using the word "there" — Rabbi Eleazar deduced that both Moses and Miriam died the same way. Rabbi Eleazar explained that  does not say that Miriam died "by the mouth of the Lord" because it would be indelicate to say so.

Similarly, the Sages taught that there were six people over whom the Angel of Death had no sway in their demise — Abraham, Isaac, and Jacob, Moses, Aaron, and Miriam. Abraham, Isaac, and Jacob, as it is written with regard to them, respectively: “With everything,” “from everything,” “everything”; since they were blessed with everything they were certainly spared the anguish of the Angel of Death. And the Sages taught that there were seven people over whom the worm and the maggot had no sway — Abraham, Isaac, and Jacob, Moses, Aaron and Miriam, and Benjamin. Abraham, Isaac, and Jacob, as it is written with regard to them, respectively: “With everything,” “from everything,” “everything.” Moses, Aaron, and Miriam, as it is written with regard to them: “By the mouth of the Lord.”

Rabbi Jose the son of Rabbi Judah taught that three good leaders arose for Israel — Moses, Aaron, and Miriam — and for their sake Providence conferred three good things on Israel — the well that accompanied the Israelites on their journeys for the merit of Miriam, the pillar of cloud for the merit of Aaron, and the manna for the merit of Moses. When Miriam died, the well disappeared, as  reports, "And Miriam died there," and immediately thereafter  reports, "And there was no water for the congregation." The well returned for the merit of Moses and Aaron. When Moses died, the well, the pillar of cloud, and the manna all disappeared, as  reports, "And I cut off the three shepherds in one month."

Similarly, a Midrash taught that when the righteous are born, nobody feels the difference, but when they die, everybody feels it. When Miriam was born, nobody felt it, but when she died (as reported in ), the well ceased to exist and all felt her loss. The well made her death known. When Aaron was born, nobody felt it, but when he died and the clouds of glory departed, all felt his loss. The cloud thus made his death known. And when Moses was born, nobody felt it, but when he died, all felt it, because the manna made his death known by ceasing to fall.

The Gemara employed  to deduce that one may not benefit from a corpse. Just as one was prohibited to benefit from the cow, so also one was thus prohibited to benefit from a corpse. And the School of Rabbi Yannai taught that one was prohibited to benefit from the cow because  mentions forgiveness (kaper) in connection with the cow, just as atonement (kaper) is mentioned in connection with sacrifices (for example in ). (Just as one was prohibited to benefit from sacrifices, so also one was thus prohibited to benefit from the cow.)

A Master taught that as long as the generation of the wilderness continued to die out, there was no Divine communication to Moses (in a direct manner, as  describes, "face to face"). For Moses recounted in  "So it came to pass, when all the men of war were consumed and dead . . . that the Lord spoke to me." Only then (after those deaths) did the Divine communication to Moses resume. Thus God's address to Moses in  may have been the first time that God had spoken to Moses in 38 years.

A Midrash read God's instruction in  "bring forth to them water out of the rock; so you shall give the congregation and their cattle drink," to teach that God was considerate of even the Israelites' property — their animals.

The Mishnah counted the well that accompanied the Israelites through the desert in the merit of Miriam, or others say, the well that Moses opened by striking the rock in  among ten miraculous things that God created at twilight on the eve of the first Sabbath.

A Midrash interpreted  to teach that Moses struck the rock once and small quantities of water began to trickle from the rock, as  says, "Behold, He smote the rock, that waters issued." Then the people ridiculed Moses, asking if this was water for sucklings, or babes weaned from milk. So Moses lost his temper and struck the rock "twice; and water came forth abundantly" (in the words of ), overwhelming all those who had railed at Moses, and as  says, "And streams overflowed."

Reading God's criticism of Moses in  "Because you did not believe in Me," a Midrash asked whether Moses had not previously said worse when in  he showed a greater lack of faith and questioned God's powers asking: "If flocks and herds be slain for them, will they suffice them? Or if all the fish of the sea be gathered together for them, will they suffice them?" The Midrash explained by relating the case of a king who had a friend who displayed arrogance towards the king privately, using harsh words. The king did not, however, lose his temper with his friend. Later, the friend displayed his arrogance in the presence of the king's legions, and the king sentenced his friend to death. So also God told Moses that the first offense that Moses committed (in ) was a private matter between Moses and God. But now that Moses had committed a second offense against God in public, it was impossible for God to overlook it, and God had to react, as  reports, "To sanctify Me in the eyes of the children of Israel."

Rabbi Simeon ben Eleazar taught that Moses and Aaron died because of their sin, as  reports God told them, "Because you did not believe in Me . . . you shall not bring this assembly into the land that I have given them." Rabbi Simeon ben Eleazar thus taught that had they believed in God, their time would not yet have come to depart from the world.

The Gemara implied that the sin of Moses in striking the rock at Meribah compared favorably to the sin of David. The Gemara reported that Moses and David were two good leaders of Israel. The Gemara compared the cases of Moses and David to the cases of two women whom the court sentenced to be lashed. One had committed an indecent act, while the other had eaten unripe figs of the seventh year in violation of  The woman who had eaten unripe figs begged the court to make known for what offense she was being flogged, lest people say that she was being punished for the same sin as the other woman. The court thus made known her sin, and the Torah repeatedly records the sin of Moses.

Resh Lakish taught that Providence punishes bodily those who unjustifiably suspect the innocent. In  Moses said that the Israelites "will not believe me," but God knew that the Israelites would believe. God thus told Moses that the Israelites were believers and descendants of believers, while Moses would ultimately disbelieve. The Gemara explained that  reports that "the people believed" and  reports that the Israelites' ancestor Abraham "believed in the Lord," while  reports that Moses "did not believe." Thus, Moses was smitten when in  God turned his hand white as snow.

A Midrash employed a parable to explain why God held Aaron as well as Moses responsible when Moses struck the rock, as  reports, "and the Lord said to Moses and Aaron: ‘Because you did not believe in Me.'" The Midrash told how a creditor came to take away a debtor's granary and took both the debtor's granary and the debtor's neighbor's granary. The debtor asked the creditor what his neighbor had done to warrant such treatment. Similarly, Moses asked God what Aaron had done to be blamed when Moses lost his temper. The Midrash taught that it on this account that  praises Aaron, saying, "And of Levi he said: ‘Your Thummim and your Urim be with your holy one, whom you proved at Massah, with whom you strove at the waters of Meribah.'"

The Midrash taught that the Cloud went before the Israelites to level mountains and raise valleys so that the Israelites would not become exhausted, except that God left Mount Sinai for the Divine Presence, Mount Hor for the burial of Aaron, and Mount Nebo for the burial of Moses.

The Midrash thus taught that Moses comforted Aaron by explaining to him that he would pass his crown on to his son, a fate that Moses himself would not merit.

The Sifre taught that when Moses saw the merciful manner of Aaron's death, Moses concluded that he would want to die the same way. The Sifre taught that God told Aaron to go in a cave, to climb onto a bier, to spread his hands, to spread his legs, to close his mouth, and to close his eyes, and then Aaron died. At that moment, Moses concluded that one would be happy to die that way. And that is why God later told Moses in  that Moses would die "as Aaron your brother died on Mount Hor, and was gathered unto his people," for that was the manner of death that Moses had wanted.

A Midrash interpreted the words "all the congregation saw that Aaron was dead" in  The Midrash taught that when Moses and Eleazar descended from the mountain without Aaron, all the congregation assembled against Moses and Eleazar and demanded to know where Aaron was. When Moses and Eleazar answered that Aaron had died, the congregation objected that surely the Angel of Death could not strike the one who had withstood the Angel of Death and had restrained him, as reported in  "And he stood between the dead and the living and the plague was stayed." The congregation demanded that Moses and Eleazar bring Aaron back, or they would stone Moses and Eleazar. Moses prayed to God to deliver them from suspicion, and God immediately opened the cave and showed the congregation Aaron's body, as reflected by the words of  that "all the congregation saw that Aaron was dead."

Numbers chapter 21 
The King thus concluded that he had received permission to fight the Israelites.

The Gemara deduced from the report of  that the king of Arad took some Israelites captive that a non-Jew could acquire an Israelite as a slave by an act of possession.

Rav Hanin (or some say Rabbi Hanina) read  to show that one who wishes to succeed should set aside some of the gains to Heaven. The Gemara thus taught that one who took possession of the property of a proselyte (who died without any Jewish heirs and thus had no legal heirs) should use some of the proceeds of the property to purchase a Torah scroll to be worthy of retaining the rest of the property. Similarly, Rav Sheshet taught that a person should act in a similar manner with a deceased spouse's estate. Rava taught that even a business person who made a large profit should act in a similar manner. Rav Papa taught that one who has found something should act in the same manner. Rav Nahman bar Isaac said even if a person only arranged for the writing of a pair of Tefillin (that would be a sufficient deed).<ref>Babylonian Talmud Eruvin 64a–b, in, e.g., Koren Talmud Bavli: Eiruvin · Part Two, commentary by Adin Even-Israel (Steinsaltz), volume 5, page 68. Jerusalem: Koren Publishers, 2013.</ref>

A Midrash taught that of four who made vows, two vowed and profited, and two vowed and lost.

For in  Achan said, “I have sinned (implying this time), and thus and thus have I done (implying twice apart from this instance).”

A Midrash taught that according to some authorities, Israel fought Sihon in the month of Elul, celebrated the Festival in Tishri, and after the Festival fought Og. The Midrash inferred this from the similarity of the expression in  "And you shall turn in the morning, and go to your tents," which speaks of an act that was to follow the celebration of a Festival, and the expression in  "and Og the king of Bashan went out against them, he and all his people." The Midrash inferred that God assembled the Amorites to deliver them into the Israelites' hands, as  says, "and the Lord said to Moses: ‘Fear him not; for I have delivered him into your hand." The Midrash taught that Moses was afraid, as he thought that perhaps the Israelites had committed a trespass in the war against Sihon, or had soiled themselves by the commission of some transgression. God reassured Moses that he need not fear, for the Israelites had shown themselves perfectly righteous. The Midrash taught that Og was the refuse among the Rephaim, like a hard olive that escapes being mashed in the olive press. The Midrash taught that Og intended that Abram should go out and be killed. God rewarded Og for delivering the message by allowing him to live all the years from Abraham to Moses, but God collected Og's debt to God for his evil intention toward Abraham by causing Og to fall by the hand of Abraham's descendants. On coming to make war with Og, Moses was afraid, thinking that he was only 120 years old, while Og was more than 500 years old, and if Og had not possessed some merit, he would not have lived all those years. So God told Moses (in the words of ), "fear him not; for I have delivered him into your hand," implying that Moses should slay Og with his own hand. The Midrash noted that in  God told Moses to "do to him as you did to Sihon," and  reports that the Israelites "utterly destroyed them," but  reports, "All the cattle, and the spoil of the cities, we took for a prey to ourselves." The Midrash concluded that the Israelites utterly destroyed the people so as not to derive any benefit from them.

Rabbi Eleazar ben Perata taught that manna counteracted the ill effects of foreign foods on the Israelites. But the Gemara taught after the Israelites complained about the manna in  God burdened the Israelites with the walk of three parasangs to get outside their camp to answer the call of nature. And it was then that the command of  “And you shall have a paddle among your weapons,” began to apply to the Israelites.

A Midrash explained that God punished the Israelites by means of serpents in  because the serpent was the first to speak slander in  God cursed the serpent, but the Israelites did not learn a lesson from the serpent's fate, and nonetheless spoke slander. God therefore sent the serpent, who was the first to introduce slander, to punish those who spoke slander.

Reading  the Midrash told that the people realized that they had spoken against Moses and prostrated themselves before him and beseeched him to pray to God on their behalf. The Midrash taught that then  immediately reports, “And Moses prayed,” to demonstrate the meekness of Moses, who did not hesitate to seek mercy for them, and also to show the power of repentance, for as soon as they said, “We have sinned,” Moses was immediately reconciled to them, for one who is in a position to forgive should not be cruel by refusing to forgive. In the same strain,  reports, “And Abraham prayed to God; and God healed” (after Abimelech had wronged Abraham and asked for forgiveness). And similarly,  reports, “And the Lord changed the fortune of Job, when he prayed for his friends” (after they had slandered him). The Midrash taught that when one person wrongs another but then says, “I have sinned,” the victim is called a sinner if the victim does not forgive the offender. For in  Samuel told the Israelites, “As for me, far be it from me that I should sin against the Lord in ceasing to pray for you,” and Samuel told them this after they came and said, “We have sinned,” as  indicates when it reports that the people said, “Pray for your servants . . . for we have added to all our sins this evil.”

The Mishnah taught that the brass serpent of  effected its miraculous cure because when the Israelites directed their thoughts upward and turned their hearts to God they were healed, but otherwise they perished.

Noting the report of  that the Israelites offered Sihon, "You shall sell me food for money . . . and give me water for money," the Midrash noted that water is generally given away for free, but the Israelites offered to pay for it. The Midrash noted that in  the Israelites offered, "We will go by the king's highway," but in  the Israelites admitted that they would go "until [they] shall pass over the Jordan," thus admitting that they were going to conquer Canaan. The Midrash compared the matter to a watchman who received wages to watch a vineyard, and to whom a visitor came and asked the watchman to go away so that the visitor could cut off the grapes from the vineyard. The watchman replied that the sole reason that the watchman stood guard was because of the visitor. The Midrash explained that the same was true of Sihon, as all the kings of Canaan paid Sihon money from their taxes, since Sihon appointed them as kings. The Midrash interpreted  which says, "Sihon king of the Amorites, and Og king of Bashan, and all the kingdoms of Canaan," to teach that Sihon and Og were the equal of all the other kings of Canaan. So the Israelites asked Sihon to let them pass through Sihon's land to conquer the kings of Canaan, and Sihon replied that the sole reason that he was there was to protect the kings of Canaan from the Israelites. Interpreting the words of  "and Sihon would not suffer Israel to pass through his border; but Sihon gathered all his people together," the Midrash taught that God brought this about designedly so as to deliver Sihon into the Israelites' hands without trouble. The Midrash interpreted the words of  "Sihon king of the Amorites, who dwelt at Heshbon," to say that if Heshbon had been full of mosquitoes, no person could have conquered it, and if Sihon had been living in a plain, no person could have prevailed over him. The Midrash taught that Sihon thus would have been invincible, as he was powerful and dwelt in a fortified city. Interpreting the words, "Who dwelt at Heshbon," the Midrash taught that had Sihon and his armies remained in different towns, the Israelites would have worn themselves out conquering them all. But God assembled them in one place to deliver them into the Israelites' hands without trouble. In the same vein, in  God said, "Behold, I have begun to deliver up Sihon . . . before you," and  says, "Sihon gathered all his people together," and  reports, "And Israel took all these cities."

After Eliezer had dealt kindly with Isaac by securing Rebekah to be Isaac's wife, he set Eliezer free, and God gave Eliezer his reward in this world by raising him up to become a king — Og, king of Bashan.

 In medieval Jewish interpretation 
The parashah is discussed in these medieval Jewish sources:

 Numbers chapter 19 
The Zohar taught that  “a red heifer, faultless, wherein is no blemish, and upon which never came yoke,” epitomized the four Kingdoms foretold in  The “heifer” is Israel, of whom  says, “For Israel is stubborn like a stubborn heifer.” “Red” indicates Babylonia, regarding which  says, “you are the head of gold.” “Faultless” points to Media (an allusion to Cyrus the Great, who liberated the Babylonian Jews). “Wherein is no blemish” indicates Greece (who were near the true faith). And “upon which never came yoke” alludes to Edom, that is, Rome, which was never under the yoke of any other power.

Maimonides taught that nine red heifers were offered from the time that the Israelites were commanded to fulfill the commandment until the time when the Temple was destroyed a second time. Moses brought the first, Ezra brought the second, seven others were offered until the destruction of the Second Temple, and the Messiah will bring the tenth.

 In modern interpretation 
The parashah is discussed in these modern sources:

 Numbers chapter 19 
Reflecting the uncleanness that dead bodies convey (as discussed in ), the Kitzur Shulchan Aruch required one to wash one's hands after leaving a cemetery, attending a funeral, or entering a covered area in which a dead person lay.

 Numbers chapter 20 
Dean Ora Horn Prouser of the Academy for Jewish Religion noted that in  before hitting the rock, Moses cried “Listen, you rebels!” using a word for “rebels,” , morim, that appears nowhere else in the Bible in this form, but which in its unvocalized form is identical with the name Miriam, . Horn Prouser suggested that when faced with the task of producing water, Moses recalled his older sister, his co-leader, and the clever caretaker who guarded him at the Nile.

 Numbers chapter 21 
Archeologists Israel Finkelstein of Tel Aviv University and Neil Asher Silberman noted that  recounts how the Canaanite king of Arad, “who dwelt in the Negeb,” attacked the Israelites and took some of them captive — enraging them so that they appealed for Divine assistance to destroy all the Canaanite cities. Finkelstein and Silberman reported that almost 20 years of intensive excavations at Tel Arad east of Beersheba have revealed remains of a great Early Bronze Age city, about 25 acres in size, and an Iron Age fort, but no remains whatsoever from the Late Bronze Age, when the place was apparently deserted. Finkelstein and Silberman reported the same holds true for the entire Beersheba valley. Arad did not exist in the Late Bronze Age. Finkelstein and Silberman reported that the same situation is evident eastward across the Jordan, where   and  report that the wandering Israelites battled at the city of Heshbon, capital of Sihon, king of the Amorites, who tried to block the Israelites from passing through his territory on their way to Canaan. Excavations at Tel Hesban south of Amman, the location of ancient Heshbon, showed that there was no Late Bronze city, not even a small village, there. And Finkelstein and Silberman noted that according to the Bible, when the children of Israel moved along the Transjordanian plateau they met and confronted resistance not only in Moab but also from the full-fledged states of Edom and Ammon. Yet the archeological evidence indicates that the Transjordan plateau was very sparsely inhabited in the Late Bronze Age, and most parts of the region, including Edom, mentioned as a state ruled by a king, were not even inhabited by a sedentary population at that time, and thus no kings of Edom could have been there for the Israelites to meet. Finkelstein and Silberman concluded that sites mentioned in the Exodus narrative were unoccupied at the time they reportedly played a role in the events of the Israelites wanderings in the wilderness, and thus a mass Exodus did not happen at the time and in the manner described in the Bible.

 Commandments 
 According to Maimonides 
Maimonides cited a verse in the parashah for 1 positive commandment:
To prepare a Red Cow so that its ashes are ready

 According to Sefer ha-Chinuch 
According to Sefer ha-Chinuch, there are 3 positive commandments in the parashah:
The precept of the Red Cow
The precept of the ritual uncleanness of the dead
The precept of the lustral water, that it defiles a ritually clean person and purifies only one defined by the dead

 In the liturgy 

 Haftarah 

 Generally 
The haftarah for the parashah is  Both the parashah and the haftarah involve diplomatic missions about land issues. In the parashah, Moses sent messengers and tried to negotiate passage over the lands of the Edomites and the Amorites of Sihon. In the haftarah, Jephthah sent messengers to the Ammonites prior to hostilities over their land. In the course of Jephthah's message to the Ammonites, he recounted the embassies described in the parashah. And Jephthah's also recounted the Israelites' victory over the Amorites described in the parashah. Both the parashah and the haftarah involve vows. In the parashah, the Israelites vowed that if God delivered the Canaanites of Arad into their hands, then the Israelites would utterly destroy their cities. In the haftarah, Jephthah vowed that if God would deliver the Ammonites into his hand, then Jephthah would offer as a burnt-offering whatever first came forth out of his house to meet him when he returned. The haftarah concludes just before the verses that report that Jephthah's daughter was first to greet him, proving his vow to have been improvident.

 For parashah Chukat–Balak 
When parashah Chukat is combined with parashah Balak (as it is in 2020, 2023, 2026, and 2027), the haftarah is the haftarah for Balak, 

 For Shabbat Rosh Chodesh 
When parashah Chukat coincides with Shabbat Rosh Chodesh, the haftarah is 

 Notes 

 Further reading 
The parashah has parallels or is discussed in these sources:

 Ancient 
Ritual To Be Followed by the Kalu-Priest when Covering the Temple Kettle-Drum. In James B. Pritchard, Ancient Near Eastern Texts Relating to the Old Testament, 334–38. Princeton: Princeton University Press, 1969. .

 Biblical 

 49–52 (cedar wood, hyssop, and red stuff).
  
2 Kings  (bronze serpent).
 (purge with hyssop);  20, 35 (water from rock; they remembered that God was their Rock);  (Meribah);  (songs to God);  (Meribah);  (Sihon);  (Sihon).

 Early nonrabbinic 
1 Corinthians  ("they drank of that spiritual Rock that followed them"). Circa 53–57.
Josephus, Antiquities of the Jews 4:4:5–7, 5:1–3. Circa 93–94. In, e.g., The Works of Josephus: Complete and Unabridged, New Updated Edition. Translated by William Whiston, pages 107–08. Peabody, Massachusetts: Hendrickson Publishers, 1987. .
Hebrews  (Red Cow);  (scarlet wool and hyssop). Late 1st Century.
John  (serpent);  (hyssop).
Quran 2:67–73 (command to slaughter a cow).

 Classical rabbinic 
Mishnah: Shekalim 4:2; Yoma 4:2; 6:6; Rosh Hashanah 3:8; Megillah 3:4; Avot 5:6; Zevachim 14:1; Keritot 1:1; Middot 1:3; 2:4; Oholot 1:1–18:10; Parah 1:1–12:11; Yadayim 4:6. Land of Israel, circa 200 C.E. In, e.g., The Mishnah: A New Translation. Translated by Jacob Neusner, pages 256, 270–71, 275–76, 304–05, 320–21, 686, 729, 836, 876, 950–81, 1012–35, 1130. New Haven: Yale University Press, 1988. .
Tosefta: Demai 1:14; Sukkah 3:11–12; Megillah 3:3; Chagigah 3:20; Sotah 4:2; 6:7; 11:1; Oholot 1:1–18:18; Parah 1:1–12:19; Makhshirin 3:15. Land of Israel, circa 250 CE. In, e.g., The Tosefta: Translated from the Hebrew, with a New Introduction. Translated by Jacob Neusner, volume 1, pages 81, 576, 644, 678, 844, 857, 877; volume 2, pages 1655–1707, 1745–77, 1886. Peabody, Massachusetts: Hendrickson Publishers, 2002. .
Jerusalem Talmud: Demai 31a; Kilayim 82a; Sheviit 47a; Terumot 58b; Pesachim 8b, 23b, 43a; Yoma 1b, 2b, 23a–b, 47a; Rosh Hashanah 22a; Taanit 29a; Megillah 25b; Moed Katan 23b; Chagigah 16a; Ketubot 71b; Nazir 39a, 40b, 42a; Sotah 8b, 46b; Gittin 42b; Bava Metzia 27b; Shevuot 4b, 14a. Tiberias, Land of Israel, circa 400 CE. In, e.g., Talmud Yerushalmi. Edited by Chaim Malinowitz, Yisroel Simcha Schorr, and Mordechai Marcus, volumes 4–6b, 8, 18, 21, 24–28, 32, 36–37, 39, 42, 46. Brooklyn: Mesorah Publications, 2006–2019. And in, e.g., The Jerusalem Talmud: A Translation and Commentary. Edited by Jacob Neusner and translated by Jacob Neusner, Tzvee Zahavy, B. Barry Levy, and Edward Goldman. Peabody, Massachusetts: Hendrickson Publishers, 2009.
Genesis Rabbah 4:6; 5:7; 31:8; 40:6; 42:8; 48:10; 49:11; 53:10; 54:5. Land of Israel, 5th century. In, e.g., Midrash Rabbah: Genesis. Translated by Harry Freedman and Maurice Simon, volume 1, pages 31–32, 37, 242, 330, 350, 411, 431, 469, 480; volume 2, pages 529, 636–37, 641, 661, 701, 799, 977. London: Soncino Press, 1939. .
Leviticus Rabbah. Land of Israel, 5th century. In, e.g., Midrash Rabbah: Leviticus. Translated by Harry Freedman and Maurice Simon, volume 4, pages 1, 134, 207, 283, 328–29, 378, 393. London: Soncino Press, 1939. .

Babylonian Talmud: Berakhot 19b, 23a, 28a, 54a, 58a, 63b; Shabbat 16b, 28a, 48b, 51b–52a, 55b, 58b, 60b, 64a, 83b, 84b, 95b, 97a, 101b, 108a, 109a, 137a; Eruvin 54a, 58a, 64b, 67b; Pesachim 14b, 17b, 26b, 34b, 54a, 56a, 65b, 67a, 68a, 70a, 78a, 79a, 92a; Yoma 2a, 4a, 6a, 8a–9a, 14a, 41b–43b, 52b, 68a, 75b, 86b; Sukkah 6a, 21a, 25b, 37a–b; Beitzah 32a; Rosh Hashanah 3a, 29a, 31a; Taanit 9a, 13a; Megillah 6b, 20a, 29a; Moed Katan 5a–b, 7b, 14a, 15b, 28a–b; Chagigah 3b, 4b, 11a, 22a–23a; Yevamot 61a, 71b, 72b–73a, 74a, 75a, 116b; Ketubot 106a; Nedarim 37a, 55a; Nazir 6b, 19a, 44b–45a, 49b, 53b–54a, 61b, 64a; Sotah 12b, 16b, 38b, 46a; Gittin 38a, 53a, 57b, 76a, 86b; Kiddushin 25a, 30b–31a, 36b, 58a–b, 62a; Bava Kamma 2b, 25b, 82b, 98a, 101b, 105a; Bava Metzia 10b, 56b, 58a, 78b, 93a, 114b; Bava Batra 17a; Sanhedrin 4a, 5b, 43b, 47b, 77b, 101b, 110a; Makkot 8a, 11a, 13a, 14b, 21b; Shevuot 6b, 7b, 11b, 16b, 19a; Avodah Zarah 5b, 23a–b, 29b, 32b, 37b, 44a, 46b; Horayot 9b; Zevachim 14b, 17b, 22b, 25b, 32b, 33b, 40a, 43b, 68b, 78b, 80a, 93a–b, 105b, 112a, 113a, 118a; Menachot 6b, 7b, 19a, 27a–b, 51b, 76b; Chullin 2b, 9b, 11a, 13b, 23b–24a, 25a, 29b, 32a, 60b, 62b, 71a–72a, 81b–82a, 88b, 92a, 121a, 124b; Bekhorot 45a, 55a; Arakhin 3a; Temurah 12b; Keritot 2a, 25a; Niddah 5b, 9a, 44a, 49a, 55a, 61a. Babylonia, 6th Century. In, e.g., Talmud Bavli. Edited by Yisroel Simcha Schorr, Chaim Malinowitz, and Mordechai Marcus, 72 volumes. Brooklyn: Mesorah Pubs., 2006.
Song of Songs Rabbah. 6th–7th centuries. In, e.g., Midrash Rabbah: Song of Songs. Translated by Maurice Simon, volume 9, pages 28, 56, 72, 147, 200, 223, 289, 320. London: Soncino Press, 1939. .
Ruth Rabbah. 6th–7th centuries. In, e.g., Midrash Rabbah: Ruth. Translated by L. Rabinowitz, volume 8, page 8. London: Soncino Press, 1939. .
Ecclesiastes Rabbah 7:4, 23. 6th–8th centuries. In, e.g., Midrash Rabbah: Ecclesiastes. Translated by Maurice Simon, volume 8, pages 33, 60, 133, 144, 171, 208, 216–17, 288. London: Soncino Press, 1939. .

 Medieval 

Avot of Rabbi Natan, 12:1; 29:7; 34:6; 36:4. Circa 700–900 C.E. In, e.g., The Fathers According to Rabbi Nathan. Translated by Judah Goldin, pages 64, 120, 139, 150. New Haven: Yale University Press, 1955. . The Fathers According to Rabbi Nathan: An Analytical Translation and Explanation. Translated by Jacob Neusner, pages 89, 179, 205, 217. Atlanta: Scholars Press, 1986. .
Deuteronomy Rabbah. Land of Israel, 9th century. In, e.g., Midrash Rabbah: Deuteronomy/Lamentations. Translated by Harry Freedman and Maurice Simon, volume 7, pages 7, 16, 31, 36, 59, 76, 181. London: Soncino Press, 1939. .
Exodus Rabbah. 10th century. In, e.g., Midrash Rabbah: Exodus. Translated by Simon M. Lehrman, volume 3, pages 25, 31, 73, 211, 231, 260, 302, 307, 312, 359, 404, 448, 492. London: Soncino Press, 1939. .
Lamentations Rabbah. 10th century. In, e.g., Midrash Rabbah: Deuteronomy/Lamentations. Translated by A. Cohen, volume 7, pages 17, 145, 166, 207, 239. London: Soncino Press, 1939. .
Rashi. Commentary. Numbers 19–22. Troyes, France, late 11th Century. In, e.g., Rashi. The Torah: With Rashi's Commentary Translated, Annotated, and Elucidated. Translated and annotated by Yisrael Isser Zvi Herczeg, volume 4, pages 225–68. Brooklyn: Mesorah Publications, 1997. .

Rashbam. Commentary on the Torah. Troyes, early 12th century. In, e.g., Rashbam's Commentary on Leviticus and Numbers: An Annotated Translation. Edited and translated by Martin I. Lockshin, pages 247–61. Providence: Brown Judaic Studies, 2001. .
Judah Halevi. Kuzari. 3:53. Toledo, Spain, 1130–1140. In, e.g., Jehuda Halevi. Kuzari: An Argument for the Faith of Israel. Introduction by Henry Slonimsky, page 181. New York: Schocken, 1964. .
Numbers Rabbah 19:1–33. 12th Century. In, e.g., Midrash Rabbah: Numbers. Translated by Judah J. Slotki, volume 5, pages 2, 4, 92, 269, 271; volume 6, pages 486, 511, 532, 573, 674, 693, 699, 732, 745–85, 788, 794, 810, 820, 831, 842. London: Soncino Press, 1939. .
Abraham ibn Ezra. Commentary on the Torah. Mid-12th century. In, e.g., Ibn Ezra's Commentary on the Pentateuch: Numbers (Ba-Midbar). Translated and annotated by H. Norman Strickman and Arthur M. Silver, pages 152–77. New York: Menorah Publishing Company, 1999. .

Maimonides. Mishneh Torah: Hilchot Tum'at Meit (The Laws of Impurity from the Dead) and Hilchot Parah Adumah (The Laws of the Red Cow). Egypt. Circa 1170–1180. In, e.g., Mishneh Torah: Sefer Taharah I. Translated by Eliyahu Touger, pages 12–305. New York: Moznaim Publishing Corporation, 2009. .
Maimonides. The Guide for the Perplexed, part 1, chapter 15; part 2, chapters 6, 42; part 3, chapters 43, 47, 50. Cairo, Egypt, 1190. In, e.g., Moses Maimonides. The Guide for the Perplexed. Translated by Michael Friedländer, pages 26, 160, 237, 354, 368, 370, 383. New York: Dover Publications, 1956. .
Hezekiah ben Manoah. Hizkuni. France, circa 1240. In, e.g., Chizkiyahu ben Manoach. Chizkuni: Torah Commentary. Translated and annotated by Eliyahu Munk, volume 4, pages 951–79. Jerusalem: Ktav Publishers, 2013. .

Nachmanides. Commentary on the Torah. Jerusalem, circa 1270. In, e.g., Ramban (Nachmanides): Commentary on the Torah: Numbers. Translated by Charles B. Chavel, volume 4, pages 194–244. New York: Shilo Publishing House, 1975. .
Zohar, part 3, pages 179a–184b. Spain, late 13th Century. In, e.g., The Zohar. Translated by Harry Sperling and Maurice Simon. 5 volumes. London: Soncino Press, 1934.
Jacob ben Asher (Baal Ha-Turim). Rimze Ba'al ha-Turim. Early 14th century. In, e.g., Baal Haturim Chumash: Bamidbar/Numbers. Translated by Eliyahu Touger, edited and annotated by Avie Gold, volume 4, pages 1581–617. Brooklyn: Mesorah Publications, 2003. .
Jacob ben Asher. Perush Al ha-Torah. Early 14th century. In, e.g., Yaakov ben Asher. Tur on the Torah. Translated and annotated by Eliyahu Munk, volume 3, pages 1121–51. Jerusalem: Lambda Publishers, 2005. .
Isaac ben Moses Arama. Akedat Yizhak (The Binding of Isaac). Late 15th century. In, e.g., Yitzchak Arama. Akeydat Yitzchak: Commentary of Rabbi Yitzchak Arama on the Torah. Translated and condensed by Eliyahu Munk, volume 2, pages 741–62. New York, Lambda Publishers, 2001. .

 Modern 
Isaac Abravanel. Commentary on the Torah. Italy, between 1492 and 1509. In, e.g., Abarbanel: Selected Commentaries on the Torah: Volume 4: Bamidbar/Numbers. Translated and annotated by Israel Lazar, pages 189–237. Brooklyn: CreateSpace, 2015. .
Obadiah ben Jacob Sforno. Commentary on the Torah. Venice, 1567. In, e.g., Sforno: Commentary on the Torah. Translation and explanatory notes by Raphael Pelcovitz, pages 746–63. Brooklyn: Mesorah Publications, 1997. .
Moshe Alshich. Commentary on the Torah. Safed, circa 1593. In, e.g., Moshe Alshich. Midrash of Rabbi Moshe Alshich on the Torah. Translated and annotated by Eliyahu Munk, volume 3, pages 875–91. New York, Lambda Publishers, 2000. .

Avraham Yehoshua Heschel. Commentaries on the Torah. Cracow, Poland, mid 17th century. Compiled as Chanukat HaTorah. Edited by Chanoch Henoch Erzohn. Piotrkow, Poland, 1900. In Avraham Yehoshua Heschel. Chanukas HaTorah: Mystical Insights of Rav Avraham Yehoshua Heschel on Chumash. Translated by Avraham Peretz Friedman, pages 265–71. Southfield, Michigan: Targum Press/Feldheim Publishers, 2004. .
Thomas Hobbes. Leviathan, 3:33; 4:45. England, 1651. Reprint edited by C. B. Macpherson, pages 417, 675–76. Harmondsworth, England: Penguin Classics, 1982. .

Shabbethai Bass. Sifsei Chachamim. Amsterdam, 1680. In, e.g., Sefer Bamidbar: From the Five Books of the Torah: Chumash: Targum Okelos: Rashi: Sifsei Chachamim: Yalkut: Haftaros, translated by Avrohom Y. Davis, pages 328–88. Lakewood Township, New Jersey: Metsudah Publications, 2013.
Chaim ibn Attar. Ohr ha-Chaim. Venice, 1742. In Chayim ben Attar. Or Hachayim: Commentary on the Torah. Translated by Eliyahu Munk, volume 4, pages 1529–67. Brooklyn: Lambda Publishers, 1999. .

Samson Raphael Hirsch. Horeb: A Philosophy of Jewish Laws and Observances. Translated by Isidore Grunfeld, pages 514, 574, 582. London: Soncino Press, 1962. Reprinted 2002 . Originally published as Horeb, Versuche über Jissroel's Pflichten in der Zerstreuung. Germany, 1837.
Emily Dickinson. Poem 168 (If the foolish, call them "flowers" —). Circa 1860. Poem 597 (It always felt to me — a wrong). Circa 1862. In The Complete Poems of Emily Dickinson. Edited by Thomas H. Johnson, pages 79–80, 293–94. New York: Little, Brown & Co., 1960. .

Samuel David Luzzatto (Shadal). Commentary on the Torah. Padua, 1871. In, e.g., Samuel David Luzzatto. Torah Commentary. Translated and annotated by Eliyahu Munk, volume 3, pages 1072–88. New York: Lambda Publishers, 2012. .
Yehudah Aryeh Leib Alter. Sefat Emet. Góra Kalwaria (Ger), Poland, before 1906. Excerpted in The Language of Truth: The Torah Commentary of Sefat Emet. Translated and interpreted by Arthur Green, pages 249–55. Philadelphia: Jewish Publication Society, 1998. . Reprinted 2012. .

James Joyce. Ulysses, chapters 7 (Aeolus), 14 (Oxen of the Sun). Paris:Shakespeare and Company, 1922. Reprinted, e.g., Ulysses: The Corrected Text. Edited by Hans Walter Gabler with Wolfhard Steppe and Claus Melchior, pages 122, 322. New York: Random House, 1986. . (“No, Stephen said. I call it A Pisgah Sight of Palestine or the Parable of The Plums.”; “Look forth now, my people, upon the land of behest, even from Horeb and from Nebo and from Pisgah and from the Horns of Hatten to a land flowing with milk and money.”).
Alexander Alan Steinbach. Sabbath Queen: Fifty-four Bible Talks to the Young Based on Each Portion of the Pentateuch, pages 123–26. New York: Behrman's Jewish Book House, 1936.
Julius H. Greenstone. Numbers: With Commentary: The Holy Scriptures, pages 200–22. Philadelphia: Jewish Publication Society, 1939. Reprinted by Literary Licensing, 2011. .
John R. Bartlett. “The Brotherhood of Edom.” Journal for the Study of the Old Testament, volume 2 (number 4) (February 1977): pages 2–27..
Peter C. Craigie. The Problem of War in the Old Testament, page 48. Grand Rapids, Michigan: William B. Eerdmans Publishing Company, 1978. .
Jacob Milgrom. "Magic, Monotheism, and the Sin of Moses." In The Quest for the Kingdom of God: Studies in Honor of George E. Mendenhall. Edited by H. B. Huffmon, F.A. Spina, A.R.W. Green, pages 251–265. Winona Lake, Indiana: Eisenbrauns, 1983. .
Philip J. Budd. Word Biblical Commentary: Volume 5: Numbers, pages 208–73. Waco, Texas: Word Books, 1984. .
Pinchas H. Peli. Torah Today: A Renewed Encounter with Scripture, pages 177–79. Washington, D.C.: B'nai B'rith Books, 1987. .
Jacob Milgrom. The JPS Torah Commentary: Numbers: The Traditional Hebrew Text with the New JPS Translation, pages 157–84, 438–67. Philadelphia: Jewish Publication Society, 1990. .
Mark S. Smith. The Early History of God: Yahweh and the Other Deities in Ancient Israel, pages 97, 143, 149, 165. New York: HarperSanFrancisco, 1990. .
Mary Douglas. In the Wilderness: The Doctrine of Defilement in the Book of Numbers, pages xix, xxvi, 87, 100, 110, 112, 120–21, 123, 126, 130, 140–41, 147, 150, 159, 164, 166–67, 170, 188, 190–92, 199, 207–08, 211, 213, 215–16, 221, 226. Oxford: Oxford University Press, 1993. Reprinted 2004. .
Baruch A. Levine. Numbers 1–20, volume 4, pages 455–95. New York: Anchor Bible, 1993. .
Judith S. Antonelli. "The Waters of Life." In In the Image of God: A Feminist Commentary on the Torah, pages 361–67. Northvale, New Jersey: Jason Aronson, 1995. .
Daniel C. Browning Jr. “The Strange Search for the Ashes of the Red Heifer” Biblical Archaeologist, volume 59 (number 2) (June 1996): pages 74–89.

Ellen Frankel. The Five Books of Miriam: A Woman's Commentary on the Torah, pages 224–27. New York: G. P. Putnam's Sons, 1996. .
W. Gunther Plaut. The Haftarah Commentary, pages 375–86. New York: UAHC Press, 1996. .
Sorel Goldberg Loeb and Barbara Binder Kadden. Teaching Torah: A Treasury of Insights and Activities, pages 260–65. Denver: A.R.E. Publishing, 1997. .
Robert Goodman. “Shabbat.” In Teaching Jewish Holidays: History, Values, and Activities, pages 1–19. Denver: A.R.E. Publishing, 1997. .
Avram Israel Reisner. "Curiouser and Curiouser: The Kashrut of Genetically Engineered Foodstuffs." New York: Rabbinical Assembly, 1997. YD 87:10.1997. In Responsa: 1991–2000: The Committee on Jewish Law and Standards of the Conservative Movement. Edited by Kassel Abelson and David J. Fine, pages 101, 105–06. New York: Rabbinical Assembly, 2002. . (Red Cow).
William H.C. Propp. "Why Moses Could Not Enter The Promised Land." Bible Review, volume 14 (number 3) (June 1998).
Erica S. Brown. “In Death as in Life: What the biblical portraits of Moses, Aaron and Miriam share.” Bible Review, volume 15 (number 3) (June 1999): pages 40–47, 51.
Susan Freeman. Teaching Jewish Virtues: Sacred Sources and Arts Activities, pages 85–101. Springfield, New Jersey: A.R.E. Publishing, 1999. . ( 10).
Baruch A. Levine. Numbers 21–36, volume 4A, pages 77–133. New York: Anchor Bible, 2000. .
Dennis T. Olson. “Numbers.” In The HarperCollins Bible Commentary. Edited by James L. Mays, pages 178–80. New York: HarperCollins Publishers, revised edition, 2000. .
Audrey S. Pollack. "Blood and Water, Death and Life." In The Women's Torah Commentary: New Insights from Women Rabbis on the 54 Weekly Torah Portions. Edited by Elyse Goldstein, pages 294–300. Woodstock, Vermont: Jewish Lights Publishing, 2000. .
Lainie Blum Cogan and Judy Weiss. Teaching Haftarah: Background, Insights, and Strategies, pages 30–38. Denver: A.R.E. Publishing, 2002. .

Michael Fishbane. The JPS Bible Commentary: Haftarot, pages 238–50. Philadelphia: Jewish Publication Society, 2002. .
Admiel Kosman. “The Story of a Giant Story: The Winding Way of Og King of Bashan in the Jewish Haggadic Tradition.” Hebrew Union College Annual, volume 73 (2002): pages 157–90.
John J. Collins. “The Zeal of Phinehas: The Bible and the Legitimation of Violence.” Journal of Biblical Literature, volume 122 (number 1) (Spring 2003): pages 3–21. (vow of destruction in ).
Robert Alter. The Five Books of Moses: A Translation with Commentary, pages 778–95. New York: W.W. Norton & Co., 2004. .
Nili S. Fox. "Numbers." In The Jewish Study Bible. Edited by Adele Berlin and Marc Zvi Brettler, pages 321–27. New York: Oxford University Press, 2004. .
Vicki Lieberman. "Haftarat Chukkat: Judges 11:1–33." In The Women's Haftarah Commentary: New Insights from Women Rabbis on the 54 Weekly Haftarah Portions, the 5 Megillot & Special Shabbatot. Edited by Elyse Goldstein, pages 185–89. Woodstock, Vermont: Jewish Lights Publishing, 2004. .Professors on the Parashah: Studies on the Weekly Torah Reading Edited by Leib Moscovitz, pages 267–74. Jerusalem: Urim Publications, 2005. .

W. Gunther Plaut. The Torah: A Modern Commentary: Revised Edition. Revised edition edited by David E.S. Stern, pages 1022–46. New York: Union for Reform Judaism, 2006. .
Suzanne A. Brody. "Listen You Rebels." In Dancing in the White Spaces: The Yearly Torah Cycle and More Poems, page 98. Shelbyville, Kentucky: Wasteland Press, 2007. .
Michael Chabon. The Yiddish Policemen's Union. HarperCollins, 2007. . (Red Cow plot element).

James L. Kugel. How To Read the Bible: A Guide to Scripture, Then and Now, pages 31, 238–39, 328–29, 336, 415, 440, 469, 541, 650. New York: Free Press, 2007. .

Hershel Shanks. "The Mystery of the Nechushtan: Why Did King Hezekiah of Judah Destroy the Bronze Serpent that Moses Had Fashioned To Protect the Israelites." Biblical Archaeology Review, volume 33 (number 2) (March/April 2007): pages 58–63.
Sara Paretsky. Bleeding Kansas. New York: G.P. Putnam's Sons, 2008. . (Red Cow plot element).The Torah: A Women's Commentary. Edited by Tamara Cohn Eskenazi and Andrea L. Weiss, pages 915–36. New York: URJ Press, 2008. .
R. Dennis Cole. "Numbers." In Zondervan Illustrated Bible Backgrounds Commentary. Edited by John H. Walton, volume 1, pages 369–78. Grand Rapids, Michigan: Zondervan, 2009. .
Reuven Hammer. Entering Torah: Prefaces to the Weekly Torah Portion, pages 225–30. New York: Gefen Publishing House, 2009. .
Jacob J. Staub. “The Healing Serpent: Recovering Long Lost Jewish Fragments: Parashat Hukkat (Numbers 19:1–22:1).” In Torah Queeries: Weekly Commentaries on the Hebrew Bible. Edited by Gregg Drinkwater, Joshua Lesser, and David Shneer; foreword by Judith Plaskow, pages 206–11. New York: New York University Press, 2009. .
Union for Reform Judaism. “Eating Jewishly.” New York, 2009. (resolution adopted by the URJ).
Edward Bridge. “Polite Israel and Impolite Edom: Israel’s Request to Travel through Edom in Numbers 20.14–21.” Journal for the Study of the Old Testament, volume 35 (number 1) (September 2010): pages 77–88.
Terence E. Fretheim. “Numbers.” In The New Oxford Annotated Bible: New Revised Standard Version with the Apocrypha: An Ecumenical Study Bible. Edited by Michael D. Coogan, Marc Z. Brettler, Carol A. Newsom, and Pheme Perkins, pages 217–22. New York: Oxford University Press, Revised 4th Edition 2010. .
Ari Z. Zivotofsky. Jewish Action (Fall 2010): pages 77–78.The Commentators' Bible: Numbers: The JPS Miqra'ot Gedolot. Edited, translated, and annotated by Michael Carasik, pages 138–62. Philadelphia: Jewish Publication Society, 2011. .
James S. A. Corey. Leviathon Wakes, chapter 44. Orbit, 2011. . ("He knew the story of Moses seeing a promised land he would never enter. Miller wondered how the old prophet would've felt if he'd been ushered in for moment, a day, a week, a year, and then dropped back out into the desert. Kinder never to leave the wastelands. Safer.")

Calum Carmichael. The Book of Numbers: A Critique of Genesis, pages 103–34. New Haven: Yale University Press, 2012. .
William G. Dever. The Lives of Ordinary People in Ancient Israel: When Archaeology and the Bible Intersect, pages 44, 46. Grand Rapids, Michigan: William B. Eerdmans Publishing Company, 2012. .

Shmuel Herzfeld. "Homosexuality and Orthodox Jews." In Fifty-Four Pick Up: Fifteen-Minute Inspirational Torah Lessons, pages 223–26. Jerusalem: Gefen Publishing House, 2012. .
Shlomo Riskin. Torah Lights: Bemidbar: Trials and Tribulations in Times of Transition, pages 153–77. New Milford, Connecticut: Maggid Books, 2012. .*Michael Kagan. "Puzzlement: Suddenly there is chaos and unknowing." The Jerusalem Report, volume 24 (number 6) (June 12, 2013): page 45.Dig. USA Network, 2015. (Red Cow plot element).

Jonathan Sacks. Lessons in Leadership: A Weekly Reading of the Jewish Bible, pages 211–15. New Milford, Connecticut: Maggid Books, 2015. .
Avivah Gottlieb Zornberg. Bewilderments: Reflections on the Book of Numbers, pages 194–233. New York: Schocken Books, 2015. .
Jonathan Sacks. Essays on Ethics: A Weekly Reading of the Jewish Bible, pages 245–49. New Milford, Connecticut: Maggid Books, 2016. .
Ed Greenstein. “What was the Book of the Wars of the Lord?” Passaic, New Jersey: thetorah.com, 2017.
Shai Held. The Heart of Torah, Volume 2: Essays on the Weekly Torah Portion: Leviticus, Numbers, and Deuteronomy, pages 146–57. Philadelphia: Jewish Publication Society, 2017. .
Steven Levy and Sarah Levy. The JPS Rashi Discussion Torah Commentary, pages 130–33. Philadelphia: Jewish Publication Society, 2017. .
Jonathan Sacks. Numbers: The Wilderness Years: Covenant & Conversation: A Weekly Reading of the Jewish Bible'', pages 235–82. New Milford, Connecticut: Maggid Books, 2017. .

External links

Texts 
Masoretic text and 1917 JPS translation
Hear the parashah chanted 
Hear the parashah read in Hebrew

Commentaries 

Academy for Jewish Religion, California
Academy for Jewish Religion, New York
Aish.com 
Akhlah: The Jewish Children's Learning Network
Aleph Beta Academy
American Jewish University — Ziegler School of Rabbinic Studies
Anshe Emes Synagogue, Los Angeles
Ari Goldwag
Ascent of Safed
Bar-Ilan University
Chabad.org
eparsha.com
G-dcast
The Israel Koschitzky Virtual Beit Midrash
Jewish Agency for Israel
Jewish Theological Seminary
Mechon Hadar
MyJewishLearning.com
Ohr Sameach
ON Scripture — The Torah
Orthodox Union
OzTorah, Torah from Australia
Oz Ve Shalom — Netivot Shalom
Pardes from Jerusalem
Professor James L. Kugel
Professor Michael Carasik
Rabbi Fabian Werbin
Rabbi Jonathan Sacks
RabbiShimon.com 
Rabbi Shlomo Riskin
Rabbi Shmuel Herzfeld
Rabbi Stan Levin 
Reconstructionist Judaism 
Sephardic Institute
Shiur.com
613.org Jewish Torah Audio
Tanach Study Center
TheTorah.com
Torah from Dixie
Torah.org
TorahVort.com
Union for Reform Judaism 
United Synagogue of Conservative Judaism
What's Bothering Rashi?
Yeshiva University
Yeshivat Chovevei Torah

Weekly Torah readings in Sivan
Weekly Torah readings in Tammuz (Hebrew month)
Weekly Torah readings from Numbers